Herman Long may refer to:

Herman Long (baseball) (1866–1909), American baseball shortstop
Herman H. Long (1912–1976), American academic, administrator and author of race relations studies

See also
Long (surname)